Maximilian Spinola (July 10, 1780 – November 12, 1857) was an Italian entomologist.

Background

Spinola was born in Pézenas, Hérault, France. The family of Spinola was of very long standing and had great wealth and power in Genoa. Maximilian Spinola was a descendant of the famous Spanish General Ambrogio Spinola, marqués de los Balbases (1569–1630) and much of his wealth derived from land held in Spain and South America. He was linked to
Camillo Pallavicini.

Research
He received many insects from his properties in Spain and South America. He also made extensive, and expensive purchases especially of large showy tropical beetles and wasps. His entomological contributions were mainly in the orders Coleoptera, Hymenoptera and Hemiptera.

Spinola made very important contributions to entomology, describing many taxa, especially in  Spinola M. M., 1850.Tavola sinottica dei generi spettanti alla classe degli insetti Arthroidignati, Hemiptera Linn., Latr. - Rhyngota Fab. - Rhynchota Burm. Memoria del Socio Attuale signor Marchese Massimiliano Spinola Modena, Dal tipi delle R.D. Camera. Soc. Ital. Sci., T.25, pt.1: 138 pp.

He is listed, as Count Maximilian Spinola, as an ordinary member of the Entomological Society of London in the Society's first volume of transactions published in 1836. At that time he lived in Genoa.

Spinola's Coleoptera (with types purchased from Dejean), Hymenoptera (with types purchased from Audinet-Serville and Amédée Louis Michel le Peletier, comte de Saint-FargeauLepeletier and specimens from the Pierre André Latreille Collection), Hemiptera collection is in Museo Regionale di Scienze Naturali in Turin, Italy. Other specimens are in Museo di storia naturale dell'Università di Pisa. Most of his type specimens are extant and in good condition.

He died in Tassarolo, Alessandria, Italy.

Works
partial list
1806. Insectorum Liguriæ Species Novæ aut Rariores, quas in agro Ligustico nuper detexit, descripsit, et iconibus illustravit. Tom. 1. xvii+159 pp. Genuæ.
1808. Insectorum Liguriae species novae aut rariores, quae in agro Ligustico nuper detexit, descripsit et iconibus illustravit Maximilianus Spinola, adjecto Catalogo spiecierum auctoribus jam enumeratarum, quae in eadam regione occurrunt, Vol. 2. Gravier, Genuae.
1839. Compte rendu des hyménoptères recueillis par M. Fischer pendant son voyage en Égypte, et communiqués par M. le Docteur Waltl a Maximilien. Annales de la Société Entomologique de France 7: 437-546.
1839 Essai sur les Fulgorelles, sous-tribu de la tribu des Cicadaires, ordre des Rhynchotes Ann. Soc. ent. France 8, 133-137, 339-454
1843. Sur quelques Hyménoptères peu connus, recueillis en Espagne, pendant l’année 1842, par M. Victor Ghiliani, voyageur-naturaliste. Annales de la Société Entomologique de France (2)1: 111-144.
1851. Hyménopteros. in Gay, C., Historia Fisica y Politica de Chile. Zoologia. Vol. 6. Casa del author, Paris. pp. 153–569.
1853. Compte rendu des hyménoptères inédits provenants du voyage entomologique de M. Ghiliani dans le Para en 1846. Memoire della Reale Accademia della Scienze di Torino (2)13: 19-94.

Notes

References
 
Baker, D. B. 1999: The Faunae Ligusticae Fragmenta of Massimiliano Spinola (1805).Beiträge zur Entomologie, Berlin 49 (1): 141-146
Gestro, R. 1915. Ricordo di Massimiliano Spinola. Annali del Museo Civico di Storia Naturale Giacomo Doria 47:33-53.

External links

Internet Archive Digital version of Compte rendu des Hyménoptères inédits Provenants du voyage entomologique de M. Ghiliani dans la Para en 1846.Memorie della Reale Accademia delle Scienze di Torino, Volume: 13, Series 2, Pages: 19-94 1853.
EOL Encyclopedia of Life'' Taxa described by Spinola.Complete.Images. Type Spinola into the search box.
 Gaedike, R.; Groll, E. K. & Taeger, A. 2012: Bibliography of the entomological literature from the beginning until 1863 : online database - version 1.0 - Senckenberg Deutsches Entomologisches Institut. 

Italian entomologists
Hymenopterists
1780 births
1857 deaths
19th-century Italian zoologists